Buldan Dam is a dam in Denizli Province, Turkey. It was built between 1962 and 1967.

See also
List of dams and reservoirs in Turkey

References
DSI

Dams in Denizli Province
Dams completed in 1967